Mitch Eadie (6 July 1992) is an English professional  rugby union player who currently plays for the Toronto Arrows of Major League Rugby (MLR) in the U.S. He has previously played for Premiership Rugby sides Bristol Bears and Northampton Saints.

Career
Son of Bristol Rovers F.C. Jim Eadie, Mitch nearly followed in his father's footstep with the round ball game but soon developed a keen interest in the oval ball and impressed Bristol Rugby coach Liam Middleton.

Joining Bristol aged just 18, the utility forward has since racked up 131 appearances for the West Country side, scoring 37 tries in that time.

Qualifying for  Scotland U20, Eadie played for the age-group side nine times between 2011 and 2013.

Eadie secured a regular place within the Bristol starting line up in years to come while the side played in the RFU Championship, scooping Players' Player of the Year from his peers at the club on two occasions.

He helped the side secure promotion to the  Aviva Premiership after trying for seven years at the end of the 2015/16 season.

Despite their promotion to the Premiership, Bristol struggled in the 2016/17 season and after being relegated would be playing in the RFU Championship again in 2017/18 despite Eadie and his side's best efforts. The side knew they faced relegation in round 20 of this season's Aviva Premiership but Eadie was determined to battle on and perform for the Bristol fans in the season's closing games, stating the players "owe[d] it to the fans".

It was announced on 2 February 2017 that Eadie would leave his long-term home of Bristol to join  Aviva Premiership side Northampton Saints for the 2017/18 season alongside fellow Bristol Rugby player Jamal Ford-Robinson.

On 29 January 2020, it was announced Eadie would be returning to Bristol Bears, who had since returned to the top flight, on a two-year deal from the 2020-21 season.

References 

1992 births
Living people
Bristol Bears players
English rugby union players
Scottish rugby union players
Northampton Saints players
Rugby union players from Bristol
Rugby union locks
Rugby union flankers
Rugby union number eights
Hartpury University R.F.C. players
Toronto Arrows players